

Carrizal may refer to:

Places

Europe
 Cerecinos del Carrizal, municipality of Zamora, Spain

North America
 Carrizal, Chihuahua, Mexico, a small town between Ciudad Chihuahua and Juarez
 Battle of Carrizal, battle between United States and Mexico in the Mexican Revolution

South America
 Carrizal Municipality, municipality of Miranda State, Venezuela
 Carrizal Bajo, Hamlet in Chile through which FPMR smuggled Cuban arms into Chile in 1986
 El Carrizal Dam, dam of Tunuyán River, Argentina

See also
 Carrizo (disambiguation)